Morpho rhetenor, the Rhetenor blue morpho, is a Neotropical butterfly of the family Nymphalidae. It is found in Suriname, French Guiana, Brazil, Peru, Ecuador, Colombia, and Venezuela.

Description
Hans Fruhstorfer describes: "M. rhetenor, already named by Cramer the 'blue elongate Atlas butterfly', has the apex of the forewing more produced than any other Morphid species; a characteristic, however, that partially disappears in the female, which more resembles that of cypris. The male is one of the most brilliantly glossy species and has only a quite inconsiderable black apical spot and a white costal patch on the forewing. The under surface is noteworthy for the contrast between the black basal area and a brown distal region, which are separated by a median band of a more or less pure white and of varying extent according to the locality. Both wings beneath show brown rounded eye-spots entirely without white pupils."

Sex difference
Morpho rhetenor is sexually dimorphic. The female (shown in the Seitz plate below) is bigger than the bright blue male and has a dark-brown upperside with a lighter brown outer edge. There is a central yellow area tapering into a triangle and isolated patches as it crosses the forewings and a separate chain of yellow spots crosses the forewings and hindwings.

Biology
The larva feeds on Palmae and Macrolobium bifolium.

Behaviour
In 1913, Fruhstorfer wrote: "[forma] eusebes Fruhst. inhabits the Amazon region, where Michael has observed it at Obidos in August and September, and Dr. Hahnel at Iquitos and Jurimaguas. According to Dr. Hahnel (Iris 1890, p. 235) eusebes always flies at a great height and energetically, mounting from 3 to 6 m. with an undulating flight, and can only occasionally be attracted to fly down on to wings of Morpho menelaus laid on the ground. The female settles on wet places on the banks of rivers (a habit which I also observed in M. anaxibia in Sta. Catharina). When disturbed they only fly away slowly, in contrast to the males. The males emit a smell of sulphur (Hahnel 1.c. p. 308)."

Etymology
Rhetenor is a literary reference. In Ovid's Metamorphoses, Rhetenor was a companion of Diomedes.

Subspecies
Morpho rhetenor rhetenor
Morpho rhetenor cacica (Staudinger, 1876)
Morpho rhetenor helena (Staudinger, 1890)

References

 Le Moult (E.) & Réal (P.), 1962-1963. Les Morpho d'Amérique du Sud et Centrale, Editions du cabinet entomologique E. Le Moult, Paris.
Paul Smart, 1976 The Illustrated Encyclopedia of the Butterfly World in Color. London, Salamander: Encyclopedie des papillons. Lausanne, Elsevier Sequoia (French language edition)   page 232 fig.1(Guyana) and page 233 fig.6 M. r. helena Staudinger, 1890,  female (Peru) and fig. 10 M. r. helena  male (Peru).

External links
"Morpho Fabricius, 1807" at Markku Savela's Lepidoptera and Some Other Life Forms
 Butterflies of America Images of type and other specimens.
www.butterflycorner.net (English/German)
NSG Photograph of underside.

Morpho
Nymphalidae of South America
Butterflies described in 1775
Lepidoptera of Brazil
Lepidoptera of Ecuador
Lepidoptera of Venezuela
Lepidoptera of Peru
Lepidoptera of Colombia
Lepidoptera of French Guiana
Fauna of Suriname
Taxa named by Pieter Cramer